Otterpool Quarry is a  geological Site of Special Scientific Interest west of Hythe in  Kent. It is a Geological Conservation Review site.

This quarry exposes rocks dating to the Cretaceous period, and shows the contact between the Hythe and Sandgate beds.  It is very rich in fossil ammonites, with species which can be correlated elsewhere.

The site is private land with no public access. The quarry has been filled in and no geology is visible.

References

Sites of Special Scientific Interest in Kent
Geological Conservation Review sites
Quarries in Kent